Chang'anlu is a station on Line 10 of the Shenyang Metro. The station opened on 29 April 2020.

Station Layout

References 

Railway stations in China opened in 2020
Shenyang Metro stations